Allen Balcom DuMont, also spelled Du Mont, (January 29, 1901 – November 14, 1965) was an American electronics engineer, scientist and  inventor best known for improvements to the cathode ray tube in 1931 for use in television receivers. Seven years later he manufactured and sold the first commercially practical television set to the public. In June 1938, his Model 180 television receiver was the first all-electronic television set ever sold to the public, a few months prior to RCA's first set in April 1939. In 1946, DuMont founded the first television network to be licensed, the DuMont Television Network, initially by linking station WABD (named for DuMont; it later became WNEW and is now WNYW) in New York City to station W3XWT, which later became WTTG, in Washington, D.C. (WTTG was named for Dr. Thomas T. Goldsmith, DuMont's Vice President of Research, and his best friend.) DuMont's successes in television picture tubes, TV sets and components and his involvement in commercial TV broadcasting made him the first millionaire in the business.

Biography

Early life
DuMont was born in Brooklyn, New York City, the son of Lillian Felton (Balcom) and William Henry Beaman DuMont. At the age of 10, he was stricken with polio and was quarantined at his family's Eastern Parkway apartment for nearly a year. During his quarantine, his father brought home books and magazines for the young DuMont to read while bedridden. At this time, DuMont developed an interest in science, specifically wireless radio communication, and taught himself Morse code.

His father bought him a crystal radio receiver, which he assembled, took apart, reassembled and rebuilt several times. He improved his set each time he rebuilt it and later built a transmitter, while his father obtained the landlord's permission to erect a  transceiving antenna on the roof.

While recuperating from polio, DuMont was advised to swim to regain the use of his legs. In 1914, the family moved to Montclair, New Jersey, where there was an indoor year-round pool available at the local YMCA. He graduated from Montclair High School in 1919, and went to Rensselaer Polytechnic Institute in Troy, New York, where he was part of the Alpha chapter of the Theta Xi fraternity.

Radio and early interest in television
In 1915, DuMont became the youngest American to obtain a first class commercial radio operator's license at age 14. The following summer, he worked as a radio operator aboard a coastal steamer making runs from New York to Providence, Rhode Island. As the summers went by, he made his way to the Caribbean, South America and, after World War I, to Europe, where, during the summer of 1922, he was stuck in Copenhagen for months because of a dock workers' strike.

After graduating from Rensselaer in 1924, DuMont worked at the Westinghouse Lamp Company in Bloomfield, New Jersey, in charge of radio tube production. While there, he increased production from 500 tubes per day to an astounding 50,000 tubes per day. Management decided to give him a $500 bonus, a small raise, and the "Westinghouse Award", an award devised to recognize his accomplishments. The "Westinghouse Award" was later presented as a scholarship award to high school seniors showing promise in a field of science (later the Intel Science Talent Search)  and continues to this day as the Regeneron Science Talent Search).

By 1928, DuMont was searching for new opportunities and was wooed by Dr. Lee de Forest, a radio pioneer who developed the audion tube, the original voice amplifier for radio reception. De Forest had a checkered career as an inventor and had several failed business ventures. DuMont was hired to the de Forest Radio Telephone & Telegraph Company as vice president and production manager for radio tubes. He revamped the factory with newly designed machinery:  "a high speed sealing machine, automatic grid winding and welding machine, base branding machine, basing and wire cutting machine, high-frequency bombarder and numerous tube-characteristic test sets and life racks." Factory capacity was increased to 30,000 tubes per day.

When De Forest took over the mechanical television system of C. Francis Jenkins, DuMont turned his attention to television. He was involved in the first television transmissions from W2XCD in Passaic. But DuMont realized that clear images would need the development of scanning in a cathode ray tube. DuMont worked to improve television transmission and reception and went to De Forest asking for funds to build a long-lasting cathode ray tube for television reception. De Forest denied DuMont's request as De Forest's investors were demanding better returns. Subsequently, DuMont resigned at the same time that De Forest sold his radio manufacturing business to David Sarnoff at RCA.

Cathode ray tube (CRT) and oscillograph

DuMont had developed an improved version of the cathode ray tube which was both cheaper to produce and was longer-lasting than the German tubes used at that time; the imported tubes had a life of 25 to 30 hours. DuMont's invention of the first long-lasting cathode ray tube would later make commercially viable television possible.  He started his own company, Allen B. DuMont Laboratories, in the basement of his Upper Montclair home, building long-lasting cathode ray tubes. In 1931, he sold two tubes to two college science laboratories for $35 each.

Since DuMont was a leader in cathode ray tube or CRT design and manufacturing, it was a natural step to use the CRT as a visual measuring instrument or oscilloscope. The production of CRT's and oscilloscopes was part of DuMont Laboratories located in Upper Montclair, NJ. Needing more space he moved to a larger location in Passaic, NJ in 1934. Although not the inventor of the oscilloscope, DuMont designed and mass-produced practical oscilloscopes (he called them oscillographs) for all types of laboratory, automotive/equipment servicing and manufacturing applications. By the 1940s DuMont was the leader in the oscilloscope equipment market. DuMont was one of the earliest designers of the trigger sweep oscilloscope using a gas thyratron vacuum tube (forerunner to the silicon controlled rectifier or SCR). This allowed the oscilloscope to show a visual trace at a preset input signal level. In addition the sweep (trace across the CRT screen) could be regulated by the sweep speed or sweep frequency. This design allowed the oscilloscope to provide better visual detail of the measurement being studied. The trigger was a frequency synchronizing type which provided stability in viewing.

The profits from the oscillographs helped him invest in television design and his DuMont TV Network. Unfortunately the time spent on his TV ventures proved to be  the end of his profitable oscillograph business.  In 1947, a young equipment manufacturer called Tektronix produced the model 511 Time Base Trigger and Sweep Oscilloscope for $795.  The use of time instead of frequency to measure a sweep across the CRT was Tektronix's big selling point. Time measurements are easier to interpret pulses and complex waveforms.  It has been mentioned informally that Allen DuMont saw the model 511 demonstrated at an electronics show. He tried it and was impressed, but commented to Howard Vollum and Jack Murdock, co-founders of Tektronix that it was too expensive and they would be lucky to sell any.  Tektronix's time base trigger and time sweep generator design would become the standard in the 1950s and into the 21st century. Tektronix would replace DuMont Oscillographs as the leading selling oscilloscope brand.

When Fairchild Camera and Instrument acquired DuMont Laboratories in 1960, oscilloscopes were still being made with the DuMont name brand. Allen DuMont became Group General Manager of the DuMont Division, until his death in 1965. All DuMont oscilloscopes in the late 1950s and after the Fairchild acquisition were using the time base trigger and time sweep generator method introduced by Tektronix. The DuMont line of oscilloscopes continued to be produced into the 1980s.

These special tubes allowed scientists working on the Manhattan Project to study the action of accelerated electrons.

Other achievements 

In 1932, DuMont proposed a "ship finder" device to the United States Army Signal Corps at Fort Monmouth, New Jersey, that used radio wave distortions to locate objects on a cathode ray tube screen, a type of radar. The military asked him, however, not to take out a patent for developing what they wanted to maintain as a secret, and so he is not often mentioned among those responsible for radar.

In 1932, DuMont invented the magic eye tube also known as the Electron Ray Tube, used as a tuning accessory in radios and as a level meter in mono and stereo home reel-to-reel tape recorders.  In the 1930s the manufacture of mechanical panel meters were labor-intensive and expensive. Magic eye tubes provided radio designers with a less expensive and more profitable way to add a feature usually found in higher price equipment. The general public reception was a success as customers like the green glow and the seemingly magical way it worked.  He released information on his invention the following year.  He sold the patents and rights to RCA for $20,000 to help fund his other projects.

DuMont produced black and white televisions in the late 1930s, 1940s and 1950s that were generally regarded as offering highest quality and durability. Many of these premium sets included a built in AM/FM radio and record player.

DuMont sold his television manufacturing division to Emerson Radio in 1958, and sold the remainder of the company to Fairchild Camera in 1960. Fairchild later developed semiconductor microchips. Robert Noyce, a co-founder of Intel, originally worked for DuMont as an engineer.

DuMont Television Network

The DuMont Television Network was not an unqualified success, being faced with the major problem of how to make a profit without the benefit of an already established radio network as a base. After ten years, DuMont shuttered the network and sold what remained of his television operations to John Kluge in 1956, which Kluge renamed Metromedia. DuMont's partner, Thomas T. Goldsmith (for whom the Washington, D.C. station WTTG was named), remained on Metromedia's board of directors from this time all the way until Kluge sold the stations to the Fox Television Stations Group in 1986, when the Fox network was formed.

Awards, family and later life
DuMont was the first to provide funding for educational television broadcasting. He was the recipient of numerous honorary degrees and awards, among them the Cross of Knight awarded by the French Government, the Horatio Alger Award, the Westinghouse Award, and the DeForest Medal. He is also a holder of over 30 patents in cathode ray tubes and other television equipment.

DuMont enjoyed sailing. He owned a cruiser, the Hurricane III. He would participate in boat races and compete in navigation skills competition, winning three national championships. He died in 1965 and is buried in Mount Hebron Cemetery in Montclair, New Jersey. He was survived by his wife Ethel and their two children, Allen Jr. and Yvonne. The television center at Montclair State University bears his name and produces programs for the NJTV system (formerly New Jersey Network).

Notes

References

 "DuMont, Allen Balcom", Current Biography Yearbook 1946, pages 162–4.

External links

Allen B. Dumont helps U.S. Army develop Countermeasure by reproducing a critical vacuum tube in a captured WW2 Nazi radar.  Results is the sparing of thousands of U.S. and British flyers lives.
 Allen B. DuMont and Thomas D. Goldsmith, Jr. in 1954 on the DuMont network series, "What's the Story?"  - discussing the future of color TV

People from Brooklyn
Radio pioneers
Television pioneers
1901 births
1965 deaths
Montclair High School (New Jersey) alumni
People from Cedar Grove, New Jersey
People from Montclair, New Jersey
Rensselaer Polytechnic Institute alumni
History of television
Burials at Mount Hebron Cemetery (Montclair, New Jersey)
History of radio
Engineers from New York City
Engineers from New Jersey
20th-century American engineers